The Mörnsheim Formation is a geologic formation in Germany, near Daiting and Mörnsheim, Bavaria. It preserves fossils dating back to the Jurassic period. It overlies the older Altmühltal Formation in its northwestern extent, and the Painten Formation to the east.

Paleofauna
Aeolodon priscus
Alcmonavis poeschli
Altmuehlopterus rhamphastinus
Archaeopteryx albersdoerferi
Cricosaurus
Geosaurus giganteus
Pleurosaurus goldfussi
Solnhofia parsoni

See also 
 List of fossiliferous stratigraphic units in Germany

References

Further reading 
 Wilkin, JTR. (2019). Taphonomy of Tithonian fishes from the Mörnsheim Formation of southern Germany. Zitteliana 93:81-85

Geologic formations of Germany
Jurassic System of Europe
Jurassic Germany
Tithonian Stage
Limestone formations
Shallow marine deposits
Fossiliferous stratigraphic units of Europe
Paleontology in Germany
Formations